Manuel Alejandro Álvarez Jofré (February 9, 1868 – July 19, 1960) was a Chilean professor of international law and a judge at the International Court of Justice.  He had been a founding member of the American Institute of International Law and of the Institute of Higher International Studies, from the Faculty of Law of Paris. He served as a judge in the International Court of Justice in 1946–1955.

Works
 Une Nouvelle conception des études juridiques et de la codification du droit civil
 American Problems in International Law
 Le Droit international américain
 The Monroe Doctrine: its Importance in the International Life of the States of the New World
 Le Droit international nouveau dans ses rapports avec la vie actuelle des peuples

References

1868 births
1960 deaths
20th-century Chilean judges
International Court of Justice judges
Chilean judges of United Nations courts and tribunals